Defending champion Serena Williams  defeated Victoria Azarenka in a rematch of the previous year's final, 7–5, 6–7(6–8), 6–1 to win the women's singles tennis title at the 2013 US Open. It was her fifth US Open singles title and her 17th major singles title overall. For the second consecutive year, Williams lost only one set during the tournament, again to Azarenka in the final.

This was the last major main draw appearance for former world No. 3 Nadia Petrova, who lost to Julia Glushko in the first round.

Seeds

 Serena Williams (champion)
 Victoria Azarenka (final)
 Agnieszka Radwańska (fourth round)
 Sara Errani (second round)
 Li Na (semifinals)
 Caroline Wozniacki (third round)
 Petra Kvitová (third round)
 Angelique Kerber (fourth round)
 Jelena Janković (fourth round)
 Roberta Vinci (quarterfinals)
 Samantha Stosur (first round)
 Kirsten Flipkens (first round)
 Ana Ivanovic (fourth round)
 Maria Kirilenko (third round)
 Sloane Stephens (fourth round)
 Sabine Lisicki (third round)

 Dominika Cibulková (first round)
 Carla Suárez Navarro (quarterfinals)
 Sorana Cîrstea (second round)
 Nadia Petrova (first round)
 Simona Halep (fourth round)
 Elena Vesnina (second round)
 Jamie Hampton (third round)
 Ekaterina Makarova (quarterfinals)
 Kaia Kanepi (third round)
 Alizé Cornet (third round)
 Svetlana Kuznetsova (third round)
 Mona Barthel (second round)
 Magdaléna Rybáriková (first round)
 Laura Robson (third round)
 Klára Zakopalová (first round)
 Anastasia Pavlyuchenkova (third round)

Qualifying

Draw

Finals

Top half

Section 1

Section 2

Section 3

Section 4

Bottom half

Section 5

Section 6

Section 7

Section 8

Championship match statistics

References

External links
2013 US Open – Women's draws and results at the International Tennis Federation

Women's Singles
US Open
US Open (tennis) by year – Women's singles
2013 in women's tennis
2013 in American women's sports